Öttingen–Schrattenhofen faience refers to a special type of tin-glazed faience from Bavaria, Germany, in Rococo style. It was popular during the 18th and 19th centuries.

In 1735, the faience factory opened in Öttingen, and was later moved to Schrattenhofen, and thus bears the names of these two towns.

Ceramics manufacturers of Germany
Culture of Bavaria